Jump Creek Falls is a waterfall in Owyhee County in the U.S. state of Idaho, just to the southwest of the city of Marsing.

Recreation 
The falls are accessible by a short, -mile hike from a lower parking lot, while an upper parking lot offers several trails that explore the falls and surrounding areas.

References

Waterfalls of Idaho